"Every Morning" is a song by American rock band Sugar Ray, released as the lead single from their third studio album, 14:59 (1999). Their first commercially available single in the United States, "Every Morning" reached number one on both the US Billboard Modern Rock Tracks chart and the Canadian RPM Top Singles chart, becoming the latter country's second-most-successful single of 1999. The song also reached number three on the Billboard Hot 100 and number 10 on the UK Singles Chart, becoming the band's highest-charting single on both rankings. The track was ranked number 98 on the Triple J Hottest 100, 1999, Australia's largest annual music poll.

Composition
"Every Morning" is an alternative rock and flamenco pop song. It is written in common time with a key of A major and proceeds at a moderate tempo, played mezzo-forte. The song has a chord progression of A–D–A–D–E5. The chorus of the song references "Suavecito" by the Chicano music group Malo, as well as Hugh Masekela's 1968 hit "Grazing in the Grass". Lead vocalist Mark McGrath explained, "We referenced 'Suavecito' because growing up in California, you know, that was just like the low rider anthem. Any car show or swap meet you'd ever go by, you'd always hear that [song] and that just stuck in your mind." He added, "We actually came up with that part, and it was very similar to Malo's part. We were sort of imitating it, and then we said, 'Let's just leave it, we're gonna change it later.' It really makes the song – we think – so we just left it."

Track listings
US 7-inch, CD, and cassette single
 "Every Morning" – 3:39
 "Even Though" – 2:35

UK, European, and Australian CD single
 "Every Morning" – 3:39
 "Rivers" – 2:50
 "Aim for Me" (main version) – 2:29

Credits and personnel
Credits are taken from the liner notes of the CD singles.

Studios
 Recorded at Swing House, Sunset Sound Studio, Ocean Way Recording, and Studio 56 (Los Angeles)
 Mixed at Scream House (Los Angeles)
 Mastered at Precision (Los Angeles)

Personnel
 Sugar Ray – writing, vocals
 David Kahne – additional writing, production, programming, engineering, mixing, mastering
 Richard Bean – additional writing
 Abel Zarate – additional writing
 Pablo Tellez – additional writing
 John Travis – engineering, mixing
 Steve Gallagher – additional engineering
 Chip Quigley – management

Charts and certifications

Weekly charts

Year-end charts

Certifications

Release history

References

1998 songs
1999 singles
Atlantic Records singles
Music videos directed by McG
RPM Top Singles number-one singles
Song recordings produced by David Kahne
Songs written by David Kahne
Sugar Ray songs